Graefia is a genus of moths in the family Geometridae. The genus is named after Edward Louis Graef with the type being G. smithii. The genus is now considered a synonym of Animomyia.

References

Geometridae